A Night on the Town was the third and final studio album by Bruce Hornsby and the Range. Following albums would be credited to Hornsby alone. A Night on the Town features Hornsby's last significant hit single, "Across the River", which spent one week at the top of the Billboard Album Rock Tracks chart and peaked at number 18 on the Billboard Hot 100. Bruce Hornsby chose Laurelle Brooks as the female lead in the music video for "Across the River".

Track listing

Personnel

The Range
 Bruce Hornsby – lead vocals, grand piano, synthesizer, accordion
 George Marinelli – guitar, mandolin, backing vocals
 Joe Puerta – bass, backing vocals
 John Molo – drums

Additional personnel
"Carry the Water" – Laura Creamer and Shaun Murphy (backing vocals)
"Fire on the Cross" – Béla Fleck (banjo), Wayne Shorter (saxophone)
"Barren Ground"– Shawn Colvin (backing vocals), Béla Fleck (banjo), Jerry Garcia (guitar)
"Across the River"– Jerry Garcia (guitar), Laura Creamer and Shaun Murphy (backing vocals)
"Stranded on Easy Street" – David Mansfield (guitar), Jimmie Wood (harmonica)
"Stander on the Mountain" – Charlie Haden (upright bass), David Mansfield (violin), Shawn Colvin (backing vocals)
"Lost Soul" – Shawn Colvin (vocals)
"Another Day" – David Lasley and Arnold McCuller (backing vocals)
"Special Night" – Shawn Colvin (backing vocals)
"These Arms of Mine" – Bridgette Bryant, David Lasley, Arnold McCuller and Fred White (backing vocals)

Production
 Produced by Bruce Hornsby and Don Gehman 
 Engineered by Ed Thacker (tracks 1 and 3–11) and Eddie King (track 2)
 Additional engineering – Steve "Sound" Cormier, Don Gehman and Eddie King
 Assistant engineers – Don Bosworth, Robin Laine-Levine, Ted Pattison, John "Chamberlin" Pilatus, Neal Pogue and Chris Winter
 Recorded at Record One (Sherman Oaks, California), Kingsound Studios (Hollywood Hills, California) and Larrabee Sound Studios (North Hollywood, California)
 Mixed by Ed Thacker at Larabee Sound Studios and Chapel Studios (Los Angeles, California)
 Mastered by Stephen Marcussen at Precision Mastering (Hollywood, California)
 Keyboard technician – Paul Johnson
 Production coordination – Sharona Sabbag
 Art direction – Norman Moore and Ria Lewerke
 Photography – Peter Miller

Charts and certifications

Weekly charts

Year-end charts

Certifications

References

1990 albums
Bruce Hornsby albums
Albums produced by Don Gehman
RCA Records albums